is a Japanese footballer who plays as left-back for  club Sanfrecce Hiroshima.

Career
Takaaki Shichi joined J1 League club Matsumoto Yamaga FC in 2015. On May 20, he debuted in J.League Cup (v Shonan Bellmare).

Club statistics
.

References

External links
Profile at Matsumoto Yamaga
Profile at Avispa Fukuoka

1993 births
Living people
Tokai Gakuen University alumni
Association football people from Gifu Prefecture
Japanese footballers
J1 League players
J2 League players
J3 League players
Matsumoto Yamaga FC players
Fukushima United FC players
Mito HollyHock players
Yokohama FC players
Avispa Fukuoka players
Sanfrecce Hiroshima players
Association football midfielders